Story of one Appointment is a Russian drama film directed by Avdotya Smirnova. It stars Aleksey Smirnov,   Yevgeny Kharitonov and Irina Gorbacheva. The premiere of the film in Russia was on 6 September 2018.

Plot 
In the infantry regiment in the Tula Oblast, where the capital lieutenant Grigory Kolokoltsev, inspired by advanced ideas, goes to service, a crime occurs. The soldier, who is found guilty, faces a military tribunal and execution. Kolokoltsev appeals for help to Count Tolstoy, who decides to protect the innocent.

Cast
 Aleksey Smirnov as Grigory  Kolokoltsev
 Filipp Gurevich as Vasily  Shabunin
 Yevgeny Kharitonov as Leo Tolstoy
 Irina Gorbacheva as Sophia Tolstaya
 Lukasz Simlat as Kazimir Yacevich
 Sergey Umanov as Aleksandr Matveyevich Stasyulevich
  Elizaveta Yankovskaya  as Tatyana Andreevna Bers
 Alexei Makarov as Sergey Tolstoy
 Anna Mikhalkova as Anna Ivanovna
  Igor Zolotovitsky  as Nikolay Ilyich
 Andrey Smirnov as Apollon Kolokoltsev
  Gennady Smirnov as Pyotr

Awards
 Sochi Open Russian Film Festival: Best Screenplay,  People's Choice Award
 Sakhalin International Film Festival: Audience Choice Grand Prix	
 Golden Eagle Award: Best Screenplay
 Nika Award: Best Screenplay

References

External links 
 

2010s Russian-language films
Russian drama films
2018 drama films
Films set in Russia
Films shot in Russia
Works about Leo Tolstoy
Cultural depictions of Leo Tolstoy